A moonlight tower or moontower is a lighting structure designed to illuminate areas of a town or city at night.

The towers were popular in the late 19th century in cities across the United States and Europe; they were most common in the 1880s and 1890s. In some places they were used when standard street-lighting, using smaller, shorter, and more numerous lamps, was impractically expensive. In other places they were used in addition to gas street lighting. The towers were designed to illuminate areas often of several blocks at once, on the "high light" principle. Arc lamps, known for their exceptionally bright and harsh light, were the most common method of illumination. As incandescent electric street lighting became common, the prevalence of towers began to wane.

Moonlight towers in Austin, Texas, near TxDOT headquarters, served as inspiration for some of the first high-mast lighting towers in the US in the 1960s and 1970s.

Austin, Texas

Austin, Texas, is the only city in the world known to still have moonlight towers. The towers were manufactured in Indiana by Fort Wayne Electric Company and assembled on site. In 1894, the City of Austin purchased 31 used towers from Detroit. A single tower cast light from six carbon arc lamps, illuminating a  radius brightly enough to read a watch.

In 1993, the city of Austin dismantled the towers and restored every bolt, turnbuckle and guy-wire as part of a $1.3 million project, the completion of which was celebrated in 1995 with a citywide festival.

Detroit

The towers were masts secured with cables and were maintained daily by crews who hauled themselves to the top using a counterweighted elevator.

Minneapolis

The tower's eight 4,000 candlepower arc lights cast stark shadows and failed to illuminate streets. After the Minneapolis City Council voted to remove the tower in 1892, its signature copper ball sat in the window of a local saloon.

New Orleans

Towers were erected in New Orleans, Louisiana, starting in the early 1880s. One set of towers illuminated a section of the Mississippi River levee, aiding in loading and unloading ships at night in the busy port. A tower at the busy intersection of Canal Street, Bourbon Street, and Carondelet Street was constructed with a set of four water pipes to aid in fire-fighting in the nearby multi-story buildings.

San Jose, California

In 1881, a -tall tower was erected spanning the intersection of Santa Clara and Market streets in San Jose, California, making it the first city to be illuminated by electric light west of the Rocky Mountains. James Jerome ("J.J.") Owens, publisher of the San Jose Mercury, came up with the idea for the tower after visiting the first electrical lighting station in San Francisco in 1879.   The tower collapsed in a storm on December 3, 1915.

Wabash, Indiana

Wabash, Indiana, was the first city to use arc lamps: four mounted on the city hall dome, turned on on March 31, 1880.  Wabash used a self-regulating lamp invented by Charles Brush in 1870.

See also
 High-mast lighting
 Light tower (equipment)

References

External links

 Tower of Light: When Electricity Was New, People Used It to Mimic the Moon (The Atlantic)
 City Lights: Austin's Historic Moonlight Towers, "Not Even Past" website, University of Texas
 Photos of Austin's Moonlight towers, Portal to Texas History
 San José's Electric Light Tower (1881), History of San Jose
 "The Servant Girl Annihilator", TruTV Crime Library, Unsolved Crimes
 "Moonlight Towers", photographs by Andy Mattern
 Brief History and Map of Moonlight Towers, Austin History Center
 Infographic and Blueprints of Austin's Moonlight Towers, Sunflower Education

Street lighting
Buildings and structures in Detroit
Buildings and structures in New Orleans
Buildings and structures in San Jose, California
Towers